Haverigg is a village on the south-west coast of Cumbria, England, historically part of the county of Cumberland. In 2001 it had a population of 1,791 in 548 households, increasing in 2011 to a population of 1,849 in 549 Households.

The name Haverigg derives from Old Norse and can be translated as "the hill where oats are grown".

Haverigg is at the mouth of the Duddon Estuary, a protected area important for birds and other wildlife. Haverigg has an extensive, quiet Blue Flag beach. There is also access to a seawall with a lighthouse which protects Hodbarrow Lagoon, part of Hodbarrow RSPB Reserve. Haverigg Pool, a small river, flows through Haverigg and joins the estuary of the River Duddon here.

An independent lifeboat station, Haverigg Inshore Rescue Team, has been based in the village since 1973 assisting those in difficulty around the Duddon coastline.

In 2020, the Lakes first Aqua Park opened in Haverigg, situated on the lagoon, it features an inflatable obstacle course plus other attractions.

Governance
Haverigg is in the parliamentary constituency of Copeland, Trudy Harrison is the Member of Parliament.

Before Brexit, its residents were covered by the North West England European Parliamentary Constituency.

For Local Government purposes it is in the Black Combe + Scafell Ward of the Borough of Copeland and the Millom Without Ward of Cumbria County Council.

The village does not have its own Parish Council; instead the Haverigg Ward is governed by Millom Town Council.

Haverigg Prison

The village is home to the Category D Haverigg Prison,  a low security prison for males from all over the North of England.

Gallery

References

External links

Cumbria County History Trust: Millom (nb: provisional research only – see Talk page)
Haverigg Inshore Rescue

Villages in Cumbria
Beaches of Cumbria
Populated coastal places in Cumbria
Millom